George Barrington (1755–1804) was an Irish pickpocket and later a policeman.

George Barrington may also refer to:
George Barrington (cricketer) (1857–1942), English cricketer
George Barrington (naval officer) (1794–1835), British naval officer and Whig politician
George Barrington, 7th Viscount Barrington (1824–1886), British Conservative politician